When Broken Is Easily Fixed is the debut studio album by Canadian post-hardcore band Silverstein, released in 2003 under the label Victory Records.

Background and recording
Forming in early 2000, Silverstein released two EPs, Summer's Stellar Gaze (2000) and When the Shadows Beam (2002). The second EP caught the attention of Victory Records, who announced that they had signed the band on October 22, 2002.

When Broken Is Easily Fixed was recorded at Mount Fairview and Unity Gain between January and February 2003 with producer Justin Koop. Koop engineered and mixed the album; Koop was assisted by engineer Rob Turri at Mount Fairview. Rainer Tan provided violin, while Shane Told and Richard McWalter supplied additional guitar. Kyle Bishop gave additional vocals to the title track. The album was mastered by Alan Douches at West West Side.

Release
On April 3, 2003, When Broken Is Easily Fixed was announced for release in the following month. Alongside this, "Smashed Into Pieces" was posted online, followed by "Giving Up" on April 5, 2002. In April and May 2003, the band toured across the Midwest and southern US states, with Choke and Self Made Man. When Broken Is Easily Fixed was released on May 20, 2003 on Victory Records. Martin Wittfooth created the artwork. In July and August, the band toured across the US, with Freya; it included an appearance Warped Tour and Redemption Fest. The band went on a short tour in October with the Fulllbast, which was then followed by a handful of shows with Rise Against. Silverstein then went on a west coast and midwest US tour in November, with Bayside; Haste, Eleventeen, and Preacher Gone to Texas appeared on select dates. In January 2004, the band supported Spitalfield on their headlining US tour. In February 2004, the band went tour with the A.K.A.s. Following this, the band toured with Strike Anywhere and Fifth Hour Hero on their tour of the US, which ran into March 2004. In May and June 2004, the band went on tour with Alexisonfire, Emery, the Higher, and Hawthorne Heights. The album was reissued on September 14, 2004 with a DVD and two bonus tracks, "Friends in Fall River" and "Forever and a Day". In November 2004, the band supported Hot Water Music on their headlining North American tour.

The "Smashed into Pieces" music video featured the whole band dressed in black pants and white shirts with red ties. However, singer Shane Told is wearing the opposite - a red shirt with a white tie. The video begins by showing a completely white room, with the instruments set up around the room. The song begins playing as the band members walk in, in reverse, pick up their instruments, and start playing the song backwards. In the final minute of the song, oil splashes across the members of the band, but they keep on playing until the entire scene is covered in oil. However, not long later, the oil flies off and they go on to finish the song. When the song finishes playing, they walk out in reverse.

The "Giving Up" music video follows a depressed man who is remembering times spent with an ex-girlfriend. These scenes are entwined with shots of the band playing, which are mostly shot using fisheye lens.

"Smashed into Pieces" was re-recorded by the band in 2013 and released on May 20 to commemorate the ten-year anniversary of the album.

Reception

As of June 2007, the album has sold 179,000 copies.

Track listing

Personnel
Personnel per booklet.

 Silverstein
Shane Told – vocals, additional guitar
Paul Koehler – drums
Neil Boshart – lead guitar
Josh Bradford – rhythm guitar
Billy Hamilton – bass guitar

 Additional personnel and production
Justin Koop – producer, engineer, mixing
Rob Turri – assistant engineer
Alan Douches – mastering
Rainer Tan – violin
Richard McWalter – additional guitar
Kyle Bishop – additional vocals on "When Broken Is Easily Fixed"
Martin Wittfooth – artwork
Eric Deleporte – design

Chart positions

References 
 Footnotes

 Citations

External links

When Broken Is Easily Fixed at YouTube (streamed copy where licensed)

Silverstein (band) albums
2003 debut albums
Victory Records albums